Irmaklı is a Turkish place name and it may refer to

Irmaklı, Ceyhan a village in Adana Province
Irmaklı, Mut a village in Mersin Provinvce
Irmaklı, Darende a village in Malatya Province